The West Hollywood Gateway is a  two-level urban vertical retail power center in West Hollywood, California. It was developed by the JH Snyder Company and designed by architect Jon Jerde, located on the southwest corner Santa Monica Blvd. and La Brea Avenue at the border of West Hollywood and Los Angeles.  The structure features two subterranean parking levels and two above-ground retail levels.

The mall is anchored by the first big box retailers in the city, Target and Best Buy, and it also features eight restaurants as well as several retail stores.

Redevelopment project. The West Hollywood Gateway opened to the public in March 2004. The site includes the free-standing famous Hollywood landmark, the Formosa Cafe.

The center is also home to the Los Angeles' largest public art display using projection technology, which is located above the main courtyard.  This art display was designed by renowned video artist Paul Tzanetopoulos.

The center "features a large outdoor plaza that functions as a civic square, inviting pedestrian activity through the use of outdoor eating areas, fountains, public art, retail kiosks and lush landscaping." As of September 2018, the parking structure offers one hour of free parking (no validation required) to all visitors.  There are two bicycle parking areas.

References

External links
 Official Website

Buildings and structures in West Hollywood, California
Shopping malls in Central Los Angeles
Shopping malls established in 2004
Shopping malls on the Westside, Los Angeles